John Treadwell (1745–1823) was an American politician.

John Treadwell may also refer to:
 John Treadwell (miner) (1842–1927), Canadian gold miner in Alaska

See also
 John Treadwell Nichols (1883–1958), American ichthyologist